The Kuala Lumpur–Kuala Selangor Expressway  (Malay: Lebuhraya Kuala Lumpur–Kuala Selangor), KLS (formerly Ijok–Templer Park Highway, LATAR) or sometimes called  LATAR Expressway, is an expressway in Selangor, Malaysia. It is part of the Kuala Lumpur Outer Ring Road. The  expressway connects Ijok near Kuala Selangor to Templer's Park near Rawang and not Kuala Lumpur as its name suggests – consequently, motorists will need to travel another 20 km to Kuala Lumpur via Kuala Lumpur–Rawang Highway. Kuala Lumpur–Kuala Selangor Expressway is the fourth east–west-oriented expressway in the Klang Valley after the Federal Highway, the New Klang Valley Expressway (NKVE) and the Shah Alam Expressway.

Route background
The Kilometre Zero of the expressway is located at Ijok.

History
Previously, the Federal Route 54 was the only gateway to Kuala Selangor, with a typical journey of 1 hours. The Kuala Lumpur–Kuala Selangor Expressway project was awarded to Bina Puri Holdings Berhad for contract amounting to MYR 958 million. The turnkey contractor for this project was Mudajaya Corporation Berhad. The construction is divided into two packages, package 1 of the proposed design-and-build contract is from Ijok to Kundang, while package 2 is from Kundang to Templer's Park. Construction work was started in the third quarter 2008 and was completed in the middle of 2011. The expressway was opened to traffic on 23 June 2011.

Features
 Many oil palm estates along this expressway.
 2 Lane Dual Carriageway 
 5 Interchanges 
 4 Toll Plazas (Kundang West and Kundang East on Kundang interchange have 2 toll plazas)
 Rest & Service Areas 
 Aesthetically Designed Bridges (Viaducts) in different locations such as Ijok and Yew Hock Estate viaducts
 Templer's Park Interchange in the eastern end of expressway is a most scenic views.

Tolls
The Kuala Lumpur–Kuala Selangor Expressway using opened toll systems. There are 6 toll plazas along Kuala Lumpur–Kuala Selangor Expressway. Each toll plaza is located around 4–6 km away. All 6 toll plazas charge the same rate which can be seen below.

Electronic Toll Collections (ETC)
As part of an initiative to facilitate faster transaction at the Ijok, Kuang East, Kuang West, Kundang East, Kundang West and Taman Rimber Templer Toll Plazas, all toll transactions at six toll plazas on the Kuala Lumpur–Kuala Selangor Expressway has now been conducted electronically via Touch 'n Go cards or SmartTAGs starting 2 March 2016.

Toll rates
(Starting 15 October 2015)

Ijok, Kuang East, Kuang West and Taman Rimber Templer Toll Plazas

Kundang East and Kundang West Toll Plazas

List of interchanges

The speed limit for the entire expressway is 110 km/h except at Ijok, Kuang East, Kuang West, and Taman Rimba Templer toll plazas where the speed limit is 60 km/h.

References

External links
 LATAR website

2011 establishments in Malaysia
Expressways in Malaysia